Willett Range is the range extending north from Mistake Peak and running for 20 nautical miles (37 km) as a high shelf along the edge of the continental ice to the Mackay Glacier, in Victoria Land. The range is breached by several glaciers flowing east from the plateau. Named by the New Zealand Northern Survey Party of the Commonwealth Trans-Antarctic Expedition (1956–58) for R.W. Willett, Director of the New Zealand Geological Survey, who gave valuable assistance throughout the expedition and in the compilation stages after its return.

Mountain ranges of Victoria Land
Scott Coast